The Koçgiri rebellion was a Kurdish uprising, that began in the overwhelmingly militant Koçgiri region in present-day eastern Sivas Province in February 1921. The rebellion was initially Alevi, but succeeded in gathering support from nearby Sunni tribes. The tribe leaders had close relations to the Society for the Rise of Kurdistan (SAK). The rebellion was defeated in June 1921.

Background 
After the Treaty of Sèvres was signed the Kurds began to feel more trustful that they were able to reach at least some sort of an autonomous government for themselves. Abdulkadir Ubeydullah, the son of Sheikh Ubeydullah and the president of the SAK, supported the idea of a Kurdish autonomy within Turkey. But Nuri Dersimi and Mustafa Pasha wanted more than autonomy, they wanted to establish an independent Kurdistan according to article 64 of the treaty. Mustafa Kemal followed up on the events in the Dersim area and as it came to his knowledge that some of the Kurds were pursuing autonomy in line with the fourteen points announced by US president Woodrow Wilson, he answered that the plan of Wilson was worthless for the peoples in the eastern provinces and they should rather follow his Turkish nationalist movement.

Negotiations 
The Kurds around Dersim began to prepare for an eventual showdown with the Turkish nationalists and raided several Turkish weapon depots. By October 1920 they captured enough to feel themselves in a position of strength and Alisan Bey, the leader of Refahiye prepared the tribes for independence. Finally, on the 15 November 1920, they delivered a declaration to the Kemalists which stated the following.

The Government in Ankara should abide by the agreement the Kurds had with the Sultan in Istanbul and accept the Kurdish autonomy
The Government in Ankara should also inform the people who wrote the declaration concerning their approach towards an autonomous Kurdistan.
All the Kurdish prisoners in the prisons of Erzincan, Malatya, Elaziz (today Elazıĝ) and Sivas shall be released.
The Turkish administration in the areas with a Kurdish majority must leave
And the Turkish military which was dispatched to the Kurdish areas, should withdraw

They requested an answer by the 24 November 1920. On the 25 December, the Kurds again demanded more political rights to be given to them in the Provinces of Diyarbakir, Bitlis, Van and Elaziz as agreed on in the Treaty of Sèvres. The Kemalists at first listened to their demands for more political freedom, but at the same time moved significant troops to the region in order to quell the rebellion. Nevertheless, the Turkish Government tried to deceive the kurds as they sent the Governor of Elaziz to Pertek in order to assure them that Mustafa Kemal agreed to the requests. Mustafa Kemal even nominated additional members of parliament from the region. The Turkish Government also offered to assign a Kurdish Mütessarif  to the region, but the revolutionaries represented by Seyit Riza and Alişan Bey (official from the Refahiye) refused the offer, and repeated their demand that they want an independent Kurdish government and not one imposed by Ankara.

The Revolt 
Following this response, Mustafa Kemal ordered the arrest of Nuri Dersimi and on the 20 December he was detained and brought to prison.

The commander of the Central Army Nureddin Pasha sent a force of some 3,000 cavalrymen and irregulars including Topal Osman's battalions.  By February fighting between parties began and the Turks demanded the unconditional surrender of the Kurdish revolutionaries. A first major encounter between the factions ended victorious for the Kurds, but fighting went on and the rebels were crushed by June 17, 1921.

Before repressing the rebels, Nureddin Pasha said (according to some sources, this statement belongs to Topal Osman):

The brutality of the repression made the Grand National Assembly decide to put Nureddin Pasha on trial. Although Nureddin Pasha was dismissed on November 3, 1921 and recalled to Ankara, Mustafa Kemal Pasha intervened and prevented a trial.

The brutality of the actions of the Turkish forces shocked even some members of the Ankara's national assembly. One of the representatives said: "African barbarians would not even accept such excesses".

References

External links
The Repression of the Koçgiri Rebellion, 1920-1921

Conflicts in 1921
Kurdish–Turkish conflict
Alevi rebellions
Turkish War of Independence
1921 in the Ottoman Empire
Rebellions against the Ottoman Empire
Sivas vilayet
Mamuret-ul-Aziz vilayet
Erzurum vilayet